Essie Shevill (6 April 1908 – 19 October 1989) was an Australian cricketer. Shevill played three Test matches for the Australia national women's cricket team.

References

1908 births
1989 deaths
Australia women Test cricketers
Sportswomen from New South Wales
Cricketers from Sydney